
This is a list of players who graduated from the Buy.com Tour in 2001. The top 15 players on the Buy.com Tour's money list in 2001 earned their PGA Tour card for 2002.

*PGA Tour rookie for 2002.
#Campbell, Bates and Slocum received battlefield promotions to the PGA Tour in 2001 by winning three tournaments on the Buy.com Tour in 2001, becoming only the second, third and fourth players to do so. On the 2001 PGA Tour, their respective results were:
Campbell - played three tournaments, with two missed cuts and a solo second at the Southern Farm Bureau Classic.
Bates - played no tournaments.
Slocum - played eight tournaments, making six cuts with a best finish of T-37 at the Southern Farm Bureau Classic.

T = Tied
Green background indicates the player retained his PGA Tour card for 2003 (finished inside the top 125).
Yellow background indicates player did not retain his PGA Tour card for 2003, but retained conditional status (finished between 126–150).
Red background indicates the player did not retain his PGA Tour card for 2003 (finished outside the top 150).

Winners on the PGA Tour in 2002

Runners-up on the PGA Tour in 2002

See also
2001 PGA Tour Qualifying School graduates

References
Money list
Player profiles

Korn Ferry Tour
PGA Tour
Buy.com Tour Graduates
Buy.com Tour Graduates